The 1990 Colonial Athletic Association men's basketball tournament was held March 3–5 at the Richmond Coliseum in Richmond, Virginia. The Richmond Coliseum would remain the home of the tournament until 2014.

Richmond defeated top-seeded  in the championship game, 77–72, to win their third CAA men's basketball tournament. The Spiders, therefore, earned an automatic bid to the 1990 NCAA tournament.

Bracket

References

Colonial Athletic Association men's basketball tournament
Tournament
CAA men's basketball tournament
CAA men's basketball tournament
Sports competitions in Virginia
Basketball in Virginia